I Can Do Nothing Alone is a studio album by American country singer-songwriter Bill Anderson. It was released in June 1967 on Decca Records and was produced by Owen Bradley. It was Anderson's seventh studio record and his first album to consist entirely of gospel music. Although the album did not produce any singles, it made peak positions on the Billboard country albums chart.

Background and content
Anderson was inspired to record the album after the passing of his grandfather in 1965. Anderson recalled sitting beside him at the hospital when his grandfather said to him, "You don't have to be a preacher to do good in this world. You can live the right kind of life and let other people know that you stand for the right kind of things and they will get the message." This inspired Anderson to compose the album's title track "I Can Do Nothing Alone". The album consisted of ten tracks, all of which were gospel songs. All of the tracks were cut at the Columbia Recording Studio in February 1967 under the guidance of Owen Bradley. Among the songs recorded with Bradley included covers of traditional gospel songs. Songs featured included "Standing on the Promises", "Where He Leads Me" and "Blessed Assurance".

Release and reception

I Can Do Nothing Alone was released in June 1967 on Decca Records. Five tracks were included on each side of the original record. Following its release, the album peaked at number 23 on the Billboard Top Country Albums chart in September 1967. The album spent 12 weeks on the country chart. The album did not produce any singles that were released. The album did however receive a rating from Allmusic, which gave it 2.5 out of 5 possible stars. Meanwhile, Billboard gave it a positive response in their June 1967 issue of the magazine. "Hit country artist Bill Anderson has a tremendous gospel hit here," writers commented.

Track listing

Personnel
All credits are adapted from the liner notes of I Can Do Nothing Alone.

Musical personnel
 Bill Anderson – lead vocals
 Harold Bradley – guitar, banjo
 Ray Edenton – guitar
 Sonny Garrish – steel guitar
 Roy Huskey – bass
 The Jordanaires – background vocals
 Jimmy Lance – guitar
 Len Miller – drums
 Hal Rugg – steel guitar
 Jerry Smith – piano

Technical personnel
 Owen Bradley – record producer
 Hal Buksbaum – photography

Chart performance

Release history

References

1967 albums
Albums produced by Owen Bradley
Bill Anderson (singer) albums
Decca Records albums